Bluegrass Junction is a bluegrass music channel on Sirius XM Radio.  It is billed as "America's Bluegrass Home", and primarily airs complete versions of music from many bluegrass artists. Some of those are Bill Monroe, Seldom Scene, Flatt & Scruggs, and Sam Bush, in addition to more modern acoustic groups playing rock and roll music on what are considered to be traditional bluegrass instruments. It is heard on Sirius XM Radio 62 and Dish Network 6062.

Bluegrass Junction was one of the original XM channels at launch in 2001. Sirius picked up the channel in November 2008 (replacing its own Bluegrass channel) after the two services merged.

During the 2015 Holiday Season (Sunday 12/06/15 at 12pm ET until Tuesday 12/15/15 at 3am ET), Bluegrass Junction was replaced by Radio Hanukkah.

Programming
The Gospel Train, "The powerful sound of gospel bluegrass from artists like the Louvin Brothers, Ricky Skaggs and Kentucky Thunder."
Grassroots is a history program featuring bluegrass legends.
Handpicked features music and conversation with musician Del McCoury.
The "Studio Special" Series, interviews with bluegrass artists.
Truegrass, bluegrass music 20 years old or older, with Chris Jones.
Derailed, "A walk on the wild side", newgrass music with Ned Luberecki.
Live from the Country Music Hall of Fame, Kyle Cantrell hosts Bluegrass stars and takes requests from the XM's studio in Nashville.

Core artists
Bill Monroe
Del McCoury
Flatt & Scruggs
Doyle Lawson
Ricky Skaggs
Rhonda Vincent
Grascals
Jimmy Martin
Osborne Brothers
Blue Highway
Alison Krauss & Union Station
Dailey & Vincent

References

Sirius Satellite Radio channels
XM Satellite Radio channels
Bluegrass music
Sirius XM Radio channels
Country radio stations in the United States
Radio stations established in 2001